Mumbai railway division may refer to:

 Mumbai CR railway division
 Mumbai WR railway division

Disambiguation pages